Charlie Sharples (born 17 August 1989) is an English rugby union footballer, currently playing in the Aviva Premiership for Gloucester. He plays as a wing.

Sharples was born in Hong Kong. As a former Gloucestershire district athlete, Sharples ran a time of 11.30 seconds over the 100m distance at the age of 17. He also ran 40m in a time of 4.82 seconds at the England RWC training camp in 2011, the fastest time recorded in the England squad. He made his début for Gloucester during the 2007/08 season coming on as a substitute against London Irish at Kingsholm. He made his first start for Gloucester against Sale Sharks at Edgeley Park.

Sharples was dual registered with Moseley for both the 2007–08 and 2008-09 seasons. Sharples scored 18 tries in the 2010/11 season including four tries against the Newport-Gwent Dragons, and made his England debut against Wales in a World Cup warm-up match on 6 August.

References

External links

Gloucester Rugby Profile

Gloucester Rugby players
Moseley Rugby Football Club players
Living people
1989 births
England international rugby union players
Sportspeople from Gloucestershire
People educated at St Peter's High School, Gloucester
Rugby union wings